Valmet (originally Valtion Metallitehtaat - State Metalworks) was a company formed in 1951, when the country of Finland decided to group their various factories working on war reparations to the Soviet Union under one company, Valmet. The factories within the group produce a wide array of products including aeroplanes, road vehicles, locomotives, weapons manufacturing and everyday household appliances. Numerous parts of the company have since been sold or merged with other companies specializing in their own fields of trade and manufacture. Valmet itself was a brand of Metso Corporation, but was spun off to a separate company in December 2013. Tractors have been produced by Valmet, both in Brazil and Finland. The brand name now in use is Valtra. The tractor business, though still located in Finland, is owned by AGCO.

All Valmet Tractor Models

Picture gallery

Brazilian Valmet tractors

Valmet logos

References

External links
Valmet tractor details
Valmet-talli (finnish) 

Valmet
Tractor manufacturers of Finland